The Beni Sakhar confederacy is one of the largest and most influential tribal confederacies in Jordan. The Bani Sakher began migrating to Jordan as early as the 16th century and grew to become an influential tribe as by around the mid 18th century. According to the 1986 Jordanian Electoral Law, the Bani Sakher tribe is made up of fourteen clans: Al-Fayez; AL-Jahawsheh; Al-Khirshan; Al-Jbour; Al-Salim; Al-Badareen; Al-Gudah; Al-Hammad; Al-Shra'ah and Al-Zaben (traditionally known collectively as the Ka'abnah half of the Bani Sakher); Al-Ghbein; Al-Amir; Al-Ka'abna; Al-Hgeish; Al-Saleet, and Al-Taybeen (traditionally known collectively as the Twaga half of the Bani Sakher).

History

Origin
The Bani Sakher was a tribe title that was given to more than one tribe, but the greatest and most famous of this tribes are the sons of Sakher Al-Ta’yun from Bani Tayy, who refer to their lineage to an offense of the famous Qahtaniya tribe; specifically the Kahlani sub-group. The Tayys lived in what is now the Ha'il Region, where Sakher Al-Ta'yun and the now Bani Sakher mainly lived on top of the "Mountain of Lions".

Then the Bani Sakher migrated to occupy the lands Tayma to Al-'Ula; where they were adjacent to the Bani Harb which led to the mixing of the two tribes leading some genealogists to fall into error and consider the tribe of Bani Sakher a part of Bani Harb. The Bani Sakher were also adjacent to Bani Anazzah, whom inhabited the Khayber, and between the two tribes there were several conflicts, including the orientalist Frederick Gerard Peake in his book "A History of Jordan and its Tribes, x, 1958" that the tribe of Bani Sakher clashed with tribes of Anazzah on the way to migrate to the Levant. The battle ended with the Anazzah's defeat, forcing some of their sub-groups to migrate to the northern more, and this explains the hostility between the two tribes.

In Frederick's book, he also documented the clash between Bani Sakher and the Al-Dhafeer tribes and that they defeated Al-Dhafeer. However, Al-Dhafeer regrouped again under the leadership of their knight Sultan Ibn Suwit, and followed Bani Sakher, whom where heading heading north of the Arabian Peninsula. The two tribes met again in Wadi Azraq, now known as Azraq, on the Saudi-Jordanian border. Banu Sakher was able once again to defeat the tribes of Al-Dhafeer, killing Sheikh Sultan Ibn Suwit where he lies in his tomb in that region next to a water ravine that was named after him (Ghadeer Sultan).

The Bani Sakher then headed towards Al-Balqa however their stay did not last long because the tribes didn't welcome them, most notably the Al-Adwan (العدوان) whom where extending their influence over the region. The Bani Sakher went to Palestine and stayed for a period of time until they soon returned to Al-Balqa. At this time, the area was under the sovereignty of the Sardiyya tribe, which was imposing a tax on the tribes that inhabited the areas in and around Al-Balqa, however when the Bani Sakher returned, they refused to get taxed, which led to a heated situation between them.

This conflict lead to the first alliance between Bani Sakher and Al-Adwan where they joined forces with the intent to annihilate the Sardiyya tribe.

Background
In the 1799, the Beni Sakher joined the Es-Sabhah and other tribes in a full-scale battle against a force from Napoleon's army under the command of General Kleber. The fighting occurred south of Nazareth, with the French having such an advantage in terms of guns and artillery that Amir Rabah, the leader of the Beni Saqr, commenting on the effectiveness of his spear, said that he "could not swim in hell with a stick."

In the 19th century, the Beni Sakher lived as nomads. Their income came from their monopoly in trading camels and from the protection they could gave to pilgrims and visitors. In 1867, the Ottoman Empire launched a raid which defeated the Beni Sakher and ended their practice of collecting khuwwa (protection money) from established settlements.

For fifty years up to 1920 the Bani Sakher were friends and allies of the Al Rashid dynasty. The relationship ended with Ibn Saud's conquest of the Nejd. It had its roots in the early nineteenth century when Abdullah Ibn Rashid was fleeing the Ibn Ali family after a conflict over leadership of the Shammar tribe. Ibn Rashid and his brother with a single camel arrived at the tents belonging to Ali Al-Khraisha, leader of the Beni Sakher and father of Haditha Al-Khraisha. Sheikh Ali Al-Khraisha was not there but all the same they were given hospitality. During the night the camel died and the next day they continued their flight on foot. Some distance from the camp they met Sheikh Ali Al-Khraisha returning home. On hearing their story he insisted on them taking the camel he was riding, claiming that no guest who came into his camp riding should leave on foot. When Ibn Rashid came to power in the Nejd this deed was remembered.

In 1875, a member of the Palestine Exploration Fund's survey team reported finding the Beni Sakher of the Ghor, who claim descent from the Beni Sakher of the Hauran, had several herds containing 100 to 300 head of cattle and many sheep and goats as well as camels and horses. He mentions that they had fewer camels than previously since their power had been broken 7 or 8 years earlier by Mohammed Said, Pasha of Nablus, but that the current government was impotent. He counted 150 tents and estimated the tribe strength as 400 men.

Two years later, 1877, the survey team led by Lieutenant Kitchener, found the Bani Sakher camped on the road to Jenin, and later between Beisan and Tiberias. Kitchener reported that their Sheikh, Fendi Al-Fayez, was the most powerful local leader and could muster 4,500 fighting men. The sheikh showed Kitchener a coat of mail that probably dated to the early centuries of the Arab conquests and appeared to be on good terms with the government. The tribe showed no sign of lawlessness, though local farmers had to harvest their crops early to avoid them being eaten by the grazing camels. The Beni Sakher showed no interest in the ongoing war in the Balkans and expressed a strong dislike of the Turks.

In November 1877 Kitchener visited the Beni Sakher again. This time they were camped in Wadi Farrah having left the area around Zerin in the Jezreel Valley following the murder near Nazareth of a British man, Mr Gale, about which they had come under suspicion. Sheikh Fendy was absent at Bosra selling camel to pilgrims on the Haj. The Beni Sakher were close to having a monopoly in this trade and could make £1,500 in a season. Whilst in Bosra the sheikh was arrested. His son was killed in a rescue attempt. The father was released and is reported as having said "My son and I were servants of the Sultan, now he has one less". This was taken to mean that the tribe would not engage in a blood feud.

In 1891 missionaries reported fighting north of Kerak between the Beni Sakher and the Hameidah. And again in 1893 the route between Kerak and Madaba was closed due to fighting between the Beni Sakher and the Anazi.

In June 1917 Fawaz el Fayez, one of the leaders of the Bani Sakher, had a secret meeting with T.E. Lawrence. El Fayez was a member of an anti-Turkish committee in Damascus and Lawrence was seeking support for his military campaign. Immediately after the meeting Lawrence fled fearing betrayal. El Fayez was killed shortly afterwards. By June 1918 the Bani Sakher were united in their opposition to the Turks and were offering to provide the Husseini forces with at least eleven thousand men costing £30,000 (£1,715,944.76 adjusted to inflation as of April 2020) a month. In addition they would donate the harvest of Kerak and Madeba.

In 1923 Ibn Saud's Ikhwan Ikhwan initiated their first attack on the Emirate of Transjordan by massacring two villages 12 miles south of Amman belonging to the tribe of Bani Sakher. In a two-day battle, the tribesmen of Bani Sakher assisted by the Hadid tribe managed to defeat the raiders. The raiders were intercepted by British armored cars and planes only after they had begun to withdraw.

On 8 April 1933 Sheikh Mithqal Pasha al-Fayez, Chief of the Al-Fayez of Beni Sakher, was a member of a delegation which met the President of the World Zionist Organization, Chaim Weizmann, and the head of the Zionist political department in Palestine, Chaim Arlosoroff, at the King David Hotel in Jerusalem.

A series of events in the 1920s and 1930s put further pressure on their nomadic lifestyle, eventually leading to famine. The Bani Sakher were saved from this by the British government ruling Jordan at the time. In exchange, the British required the Bani Sakher to give up their nomadic lifestyle and turned more towards a semi-nomadic life. In the decades since then, pressures on the Bani Sakher to give up part of their land have led to occasional tension between them and the Jordanian government. However, this tribe has always been counted as stalwart allies of the Hashemite ruling family since the days of King Abdullah I.

See also 

 Fendi Al-Fayez
 Mithqal Al Fayez
 Hadith Al-Kraisha
 Faisal Al Fayez
 Al-Fayez

References

Bibliography

 
 

 
 

Tribes of Arabia
Tribes of Saudi Arabia
Bedouin groups
Tribes of Jordan